Turia may refer to:

Places
Turia (river), a river in southeastern Spain
Turía (river), a small river in northern Spain
Turia Valley, a valley in northern Spain
Turia, Covasna, a commune in Covasna County, Romania
Turia (Cașin), a river in Romania
Turia, a village in Valea Mare Commune, Olt County, Romania
Turiya River, a river in Ukraine

Other
 Tariana Turia (born 1944), co-leader of New Zealand's Maori Party
 Turia, Thuria or Curia, woman of the Curius family in ancient Rome
 Turia Mau, French model featured on the 1968 Sports Illustrated Swimsuit Issue
 Turia, a genus of molluscs in the family Veneridae
 Turia, a synonym of the plant genus Luffa